Birds Jute and Export Limited (BJEL) is a wholly owned subsidiary of the National Jute Manufactures Corporation Limited, Ministry of Textiles, Government of India. It is headquartered in Kolkata, West Bengal.

It manufactures jute, cotton, viscose and blended fabric decoratives.  BJEL has experienced net losses over the past fiscal years and has been virtually inoperable since 2002.

The Union Cabinet, at a meeting held on 10 October 2018, chaired by Prime Minister Narendra Modi, gave the green signal for the closure of National Jute Manufacturers Corporation Ltd. (NJMC) along with its subsidiary Birds Jute and Exporters Ltd. (BJEL). NJMC had been incurring losses for several years and was under reference to BIFR since 1993. The Mills of NJMC which were proposed for revival, namely, Kinnison Mill at Titagarh, Khardah Mill at Khardah and RBHM Mill at Katihar were under suspension since August, 2016.

References

Government-owned companies of India
Companies based in Kolkata
Textile companies of India
Ministry of Textiles
Jute industry of India
Companies with year of establishment missing